The Journal of Psychopathology and Behavioral Assessment is a quarterly peer-reviewed psychology journal covering psychological assessment as it relates to psychopathology and abnormal behaviors. It was established in 1979 as the Journal of Behavioral Assessment, obtaining its current name in 1985. It is published by Springer Science+Business Media and the editor-in-chief is Randall Salekin (University of Alabama). According to the Journal Citation Reports, the journal has a 2019 impact factor of 2.056.

References

External links

Springer Science+Business Media academic journals
Abnormal psychology journals
Publications established in 1979
Quarterly journals
English-language journals
Psychopathology